Riaz Shahid (1927 – 1 October 1972) was a Pakistani filmmaker, film writer, and a journalist.

Early life and career
Riaz Shahid was born in 1927 in Quetta, British India. He belonged to a Punjabi Kashmiri family. He was the father of a famous Pakistani film star Shaan Shahid. Shaan was only one year old, when his father died. His real name was Sheikh Riaz, but was called by his nickname Shahid. He was educated at Islamia College, Lahore, Pakistan. Riaz lived in Lahore where he started his career as a journalist for the newspaper Chataan and later joined Faiz Ahmed Faiz's Lail-o-Nihar. He also wrote a novel named Hazar Dastaan.

Riaz Shahid was introduced as a story and dialogue writer to the Pakistani film industry by his friend, actor Allauddin, in film Bharosa (1958). In 1962, Riaz started his film career as a director for the film Susraal (1962 film). Collaborating with the noted progressive poet, Habib Jalib, he went on to write or direct several films like Zarqa (1969), Shaheed (1962), Farangi (1964), Khamosh Raho (1964) and Yeh Aman (1971).

Riaz Shahid was married to then famous actress Neelo and had three children. The first child was a daughter and was named Zarqa followed by two sons Shaan (actor), who is now a well-known Pakistani film actor and Sarosh, who also worked in a couple of Pakistani movies.

Death and legacy
Riaz Shahid died of leukemia on 1 October 1972 at Lahore, Pakistan.

A noted Pakistani film actress and director Sangeeta is quoted as saying, "Riaz Shahid was a visionary. Whatever is happening in Kashmir today, he showed it well in the 60s. He was the top director of his period and we should be proud that such people were once a part of our industry".

Another film producer Choudhry Ejaz Kamran reportedly said, "Riaz Shahid stood out for not just his craft but his contribution to meaningful cinema. Cinema that was both political and imppressive. Shahid directed super hit films that are now considered guide books for upcoming film-makers. While he dabbed into a variety of genres, he always preferred to do films based on serious and revolutionary ideas".

Filmography

Awards and recognition

Nigar Awards

Best Script Writer
Neend (1959)
Shaheed (1961)
Khamosh Raho (1964)
Zarqa (1969)
Bahisht (1974)
Haider Ali (1978)

Best Dialogues/Screenplay
Shaheed (1961)
Shikwa (1963)
Firangi (1964)
Yeh Aman (1971)
Bahisht (1974)

Best Director
Zarqa (1969)

References

External links
 

1927 births
1972 deaths
Film directors from Lahore
Pakistani male journalists
Nigar Award winners
Punjabi people
Deaths from cancer in Pakistan
Deaths from leukemia
Government Islamia College alumni
20th-century screenwriters
20th-century Pakistani writers
20th-century male writers
20th-century journalists
Pakistani film directors
Pakistani screenwriters
Pakistani people of Kashmiri descent